Brunei-Muara District (Jawi: برونائی-موارا ضلع) or simply Brunei-Muara is one of the four districts of Brunei. Bandar Seri Begawan, the country's capital, is located in this district, which is also de facto the district's capital. It is also home to Brunei International Airport, the country's only international airport, as well as Muara Port, the main and only deep-water port in the country. The Brunei River flows within this district and is home to Kampong Ayer, the traditional historic settlement on stilts above the river.

Geography 
The district borders the South China Sea to the north, Brunei Bay to the east, Limbang District in the Malaysian state of Sarawak to the south, and Tutong District to the west.

The Brunei River is the sole primary river and only flows in the district. It begins in the south-western part and flows north-eastwards which finally discharges into the Brunei Bay.

There are several in-bay and coastal islands in the Brunei Bay belonging to the Brunei-Muara district. These islands include Pulau Muara Besar,  Pulau Salar, Pulau Simangga Besar, Pulau Bedukang, Pulau Kaingaran, Pulau Chermin, Pulau Pepatan, Pulau Baru-Baru, Pulau Berbunut, Pulau Sibungor, Pulau Ranggu and Pulau Berambang. There is one man-made "island" off the coast of Mukim Serasa that is actually a spit turned into an "island" called Tanjong Pelumpong (Pelumpong Spit). There are two off-shore islands off the coast of the Brunei-Muara district in the South China Sea, Pulau Pungit, off the coast of Sengkurong and Pulau Pelong-Pelongan, off the coast of Mukim Serasa.

History 
The district was formed in 1938 with the merger of the then Brunei, Muara and Limau Manis districts in 1938, whereby Brunei and Limau Manis were merged earlier in 1908.

Administration 

The district's administration is under the responsibility of Brunei-Muara District Office, a government department under the Ministry of Home Affairs.

The district is divided into 18 mukims:

 Mukim Berakas 'A'
 Mukim Berakas 'B'
 Mukim Burong Pingai Ayer
 Mukim Gadong 'A'
 Mukim Gadong 'B'
 Mukim Kianggeh
 Mukim Kilanas
 Mukim Kota Batu
 Mukim Lumapas
 Mukim Mentiri
 Mukim Pengkalan Batu
 Mukim Peramu
 Mukim Saba
 Mukim Sengkurong
 Mukim Serasa
 Mukim Sungai Kebun
 Mukim Sungai Kedayan
 Mukim Tamoi

The municipal area of Bandar Seri Begawan encompasses the entirety of the mukims of Burong Pingai Ayer, Gadong "B", Kianggeh, Peramu, Saba, Sungai Kebun, Sungai Kedayan and Tamoi, as well as parts of Berakas "A", Berakas "B", Kilanas and Kota Batu. Kampong Ayer, the riverine stilted settlement in the capital, encompasses the mukims of Burong Pingai Ayer, Peramu, Saba, Sungai Kebun, Sungai Kedayan and Tamoi.

According to the Constitution, the district is to be represented in the Legislative Council, the state legislature, by up to 7 members. As of 2017, five members have been appointed to represent the district in the legislature.

Demographics 

Brunei-Muara District is the most populous district in Brunei. In terms of professed religions,  were Muslims,  were Christians,  were Buddhists, and  professed other than the aforementioned religions or irreligious.

The census also recorded 51,694 households living in 51,055 dwellings in the district.

In 2020, the district's population was estimated to have increased to 316,100.

Education

In 2019, there were 158 schools in Brunei-Muara District under the Ministry of Education, out of which 103 were government and 55 were private. For the formal Islamic religious education which is under the Ministry of Religious Affairs, there were 97 religious schools ( of the country's total), employing 1,558 teachers and enrolling 27,207 students.

The district is home to all four of the country's universities: Universiti Brunei Darussalam, Institut Teknologi Brunei, Universiti Islam Sultan Sharif Ali and Kolej Universiti Perguruan Ugama Seri Begawan.

It is also home to two international schools in the country, namely Jerudong International School and International School Brunei.

Economy 
Before the establishment of the oil and gas industry, Brunei-Muara was the center of the coal industry, which was first mined in 1837. Until 1924, up to 650,000 tonnes of coal was produced.

Today the district is the largest commercial district within Brunei, with the busy commercial centers of Gadong and Kiulap within the city centre. Brunei's largest shopping mall, The Mall is located in Gadong, along with a number of hotels, such as the Sheraton Utama Hotel, Rizqun International Hotel and Empire Hotel and Country Club. Tourism is also one of the largest contributors to the district's GDP, since the district contains the most number of tourist attractions in the country.

All of the government ministry headquarters are located in this district, such as the Ministry of Finance Brunei. Some of the international corporations' local headquarters are located in the nation's capital, Bandar Seri Begawan, namely Royal Brunei Airlines, HSBC, Standard Chartered Bank, Bank Islam Brunei Darussalam and many other corporations and businesses.

Infrastructure
Brunei-Muara District is the central hub for transport, with the Brunei International Airport and the Muara Port located in the district. The district has the Pan Borneo Highway passing through it, and is served by a network of public buses and taxis.

Kampong Ayer (Water Village)
The well known places in the district are Kampong Ayer (Water Villages) which have been in existence for centuries. According to the 1997 population estimates, about 30,000 people live in Kampong Ayer which is really made up of small villages linked together by more than 29,140 metres of foot-bridges. In order to preserve Kampong Ayer as Brunei Darussalam's most valuable heritage, the Government through the District Office has provided it with numerous facilities including food-bridges, concrete jetties, piped water, electricity supplies telephones, schools, mosques, clinics, police station and a marine fire station. All of the six water village mukims are collectively known as the water village (Kampong Ayer) but are identified as separate mukims for administrative purposes.

References

External links 
 

 
Districts of Brunei